Halolaguna oncopteryx is a moth in the family Lecithoceridae. It is found in the provinces of Chongqing, Fujian, Guangxi, Sichuan, Yunnan and Zhejiang in China. and Taiwan.

The wingspan is 15–16 mm.

References

Moths described in 1994
Halolaguna